Family values, sometimes referred to as familial values, are traditional or cultural values that pertain to the family's structure, function, roles, beliefs, attitudes, and ideals.

In the social sciences and U.S. political discourse, the conventional term "traditional family" describes an imagined nuclear family—a child-rearing environment composed of a breadwinning father, a homemaking mother, and their nominally biological children. A family deviating from this model is considered a nontraditional family.  However, in most cultures at most times, the extended family model has been most common, not the nuclear family, and the "nuclear family" became the most common form in the U.S. in the 1960s and 1970s.

Definition
Several online dictionaries define "family values" as the following:
 "the moral and ethical principles traditionally upheld and passed on within a family, as fidelity, honesty, truth, and faith."
 "values especially of a traditional or conservative kind which are held to promote the sound functioning of the family and to strengthen the fabric of society."
 "values held to be traditionally taught or reinforced within a family, such as those of high moral standards and discipline."

In politics

Familialism or familism is the ideology that puts priority on family and family values. Familialism advocates for a welfare system where families, rather than the government, take responsibility for the care of their members.

In the United States, the banner of "family values" has been used by social conservatives to express opposition to abortion, feminism, pornography, comprehensive sex education, divorce, homosexuality, same-sex marriage, civil unions, secularism, and atheism. American conservative groups have made inroads promoting these policies in Africa since the early 2000s, describing them as African family values.

In culture

Cultures outside of the United States
Interpretations of Islamic learnings and Arab culture are common for the majority of Saudis. Islam is a driving cultural force that dictates a submission to the will of Allah. The academic literature suggests that the family is regarded as the main foundation of Muslim society and culture; the family structure and nature of the relationship between family members are influenced by the Islamic religion. Marriage in Saudi culture means the union of two families, not just two individuals. In Muslim society, marriage involves a social contract that occurs with the consent of parents or guardians. Furthermore, marriage is considered the only legitimate outlet for sexual desires, and sex outside marriage (zina) is a crime that is punished under Islamic law. This view of marriage is similar to the Western Christian view of marriage, created in 12th century France, which promised salvation, sex without sin, and much more.

The Saudi family includes extended families, as the extended family provides the individual with a sense of identity. The father is often the breadwinner and protector of the family, whereas the mother is often the homemaker and the primary caretaker of the children. Parents are regarded with high respect, and children are strongly encouraged to respect and obey their parents. Often, families provide care for elders. Until recently, because families and friends are expected to provide elderly care, nursing homes were considered culturally unacceptable.

United States culture
In sociological terms, nontraditional families make up the majority of American households. As of 2014, only 46% of children in the U.S. live in a traditional family, down from 61% in 1980. This number includes only families with parents who are in their first marriage, whereas the percentage of children simply living with two married parents is 65% as of 2016.

See also 

American Family Association
Family Research Council
Family Research Institute
Focus on the Family
Glittering generality
Traditional Values Coalition
World Congress of Families

References

Further reading

 Bennett, William J. (ed.) (1997). The Book of Virtues for Young People: A Treasury of Great Moral Stories (illustrated, reprint). Simon and Schuster. 
 Bork, Robert H. (2010). Slouching towards Gomorrah: Modern Liberalism and American Decline (revised edition). HarperCollins. 
 Coontz, Stephanie (1992). The Way We Never Were: American Families and the Nostalgia Trap (illustrated, reprinted ed.). Basic Books. 
 Coontz, Stephanie (2008). The Way We Really Are: Coming to Terms with America's Changing Families. Basic Books. 
 Coontz, Stephanie (ed.) (2013). American Families: A Multicultural Reader (2nd edition, revised). Routledge. 
 Coontz, Stephanie (2006). Marriage, A History: From Obedience to Intimacy, or How Love Conquered Marriage. Penguin. 
 Gairdner, William Douglas (2007). The War Against the Family: A Parent Speaks Out on the Political, Economic, and Social Policies That Threaten Us All. BPS Books. 
 Good, Deirdre (2006). Jesus' Family Values. Church Publishing Inc. 
 Shapiro, Ben (2005). Porn Generation: How Social Liberalism is Corrupting Our Future. Regnery. 
 Stacey, Judith (1996). In the Name of the Family: Rethinking Family Values in the Postmodern Age (reprint). Beacon Press. 

Values
Political terminology
Linguistic controversies
Social conservatism
Value (ethics)
Social concepts